Jane Barnes may refer to:

People
Jane M. Barnes (1928–2000), American politician who served in the Illinois House of Representatives
Jane Barnes, American actress who married Carlyle Moore Jr.
Jane Barnes, singer / songwriter wife of Australian musician Jimmy Barnes
Jane Barnes, barmaid who travelled to the Pacific Northwest with John MacDonald of Garth

Other uses
Jane Barnes, an American brig captured by HMS Comus in 1813

See also
Jhane Barnes (born 1954), American fashion designer